Carmenta is a genus of moths in the family Sesiidae.

Species
Carmenta aerosa (Zukowsky, 1936b:1236)
Carmenta albicalcarata (Burmeister, 1878)
Carmenta albociliata (Engelhardt, 1925)
Carmenta alopecura (Zukowsky, 1937)
Carmenta andrewsi  Eichlin, 1992
Carmenta angarodes (Meyrick, 1921)
Carmenta anomaliformis (Walker, 1856)
Carmenta anthracipennis (Boisduval, [1875])
Carmenta apache  Engelhardt, 1946
Carmenta arizonae (Beutenmüller, 1898)
Carmenta armasata (Druce, 1892)
Carmenta asema (Zukowsky, 1936)
Carmenta auritincta (Engelhardt, 1925)
Carmenta aurora (Philippi, 1859)
Carmenta autremonti (Le Cerf, 1917)
Carmenta basalis (Walker, [1865])
Carmenta bassiformis (Walker, 1856)
Carmenta benoisti (Le Cerf, 1917)
Carmenta bibio (Le Cerf, 1916b)
Carmenta blaciformis (Walker, 1856)
Carmenta buprestiformis (Walker, 1856)
Carmenta ceraca (Druce, 1893)
Carmenta chromolaenae  Eichlin, 2009
Carmenta chrysomelaena (Le Cerf, 1916)
Carmenta coccidivora (Duckworth, 1969)
Carmenta confusa (Butler, 1874)
Carmenta corni (Edwards, 1881)
Carmenta crassicornis (Walker, [1865])
Carmenta cristallina (Le Cerf, 1916)
Carmenta daturae (Busck, 1920)
Carmenta deceptura (Butler, 1874)
Carmenta deipyla (Druce, 1883)
Carmenta dimorpha (Le Cerf, 1916b)
Carmenta dinetiformis (Walker, 1856)
Carmenta engelhardti  Duckworth & Eichlin, 1973
Carmenta erici (Eichlin, 1992)
Carmenta flaschkai  Eichlin, 1993
Carmenta flavostrigata (Le Cerf, 1917)
Carmenta foraseminis  Eichlin, 1995
Carmenta fulvopyga (Le Cerf, 1911)
Carmenta germaini (Le Cerf, 1916)
Carmenta giliae (Edwards, 1881)
Carmenta guatemalena (Druce, 1883)
Carmenta guayaba  Eichlin, 2003
Carmenta guyanensis (Le Cerf, 1917)
Carmenta haematica (Ureta, 1956)
Carmenta heinrichi (Schade, 1938)
Carmenta hipsides (Druce, 1889)
Carmenta infuscata (Le Cerf, 1911)
Carmenta ischniformis (Walker, 1856)
Carmenta ithacae (Beutenmüller, 1897)
Carmenta laeta (Walker, 1856)
Carmenta laticraspedontis (Zukowsky, 1936)
Carmenta laurelae  Brown, Eichlin & Snow, 1985
Carmenta leptosoma  Eichlin, 2002
Carmenta lytaea (Druce, 1884)
Carmenta macropyga (Le Cerf, 1911)
Carmenta maeonia (Druce, 1889)
Carmenta manilia (Druce, 1889)
Carmenta mariona (Beutenmüller, 1900d)
Carmenta mimosa  Eichlin & Passoa, 1984
Carmenta mimuli (Edwards, 1881)
Carmenta minima (Le Cerf, 1916)
Carmenta munroei  Eichlin, 2003
Carmenta mydaides (Ureta, 1956)
Carmenta odda  Duckworth & Eichlin, 1977
Carmenta ogalala  Engelhardt, 1946
Carmenta pallene (Druce, 1889)
Carmenta panisciformis (Walker, 1856)
Carmenta panurgiformis (Walker, 1856)
Carmenta phoradendri  Engelhardt, 1946
Carmenta phyllis (Druce, 1884:33)
Carmenta pittheis (Druce, 1899:203)
Carmenta plaumanni  Eichlin, 2002
Carmenta plectisciformis (Walker, 1856)
Carmenta porizoniformis (Walker, 1856)
Carmenta producta (Walker, [1865])
Carmenta prosopis (Edwards, 1882b:99)
Carmenta pyralidiformis (Walker, 1856)
Carmenta pyrosoma (Meyrick, 1918)
Carmenta querci (Edwards, 1882)
Carmenta rubricincta (Beutenmüller, 1909)
Carmenta ruficaudis (Walker, [1865])
Carmenta splendens  Eichlin, 2002
Carmenta subaerea (Edwards, 1883)
Carmenta suffusata  Engelhardt, 1946
Carmenta surinamensis (Möschler, 1878)
Carmenta tecta (Edwards, 1882)
Carmenta teleta (Le Cerf, 1916)
Carmenta texana (Edwards, 1881)
Carmenta theobromae (Busck, 1910)
Carmenta tildeni  Eichlin, 1995
Carmenta tucumana (Le Cerf, 1911)
Carmenta unicolor (Walker, [1865])
Carmenta verecunda (Edwards, 1881)
Carmenta votaria (Meyrick, 1921)
Carmenta wagneri (Le Cerf, 1911)
Carmenta welchelorum  Duckworth & Eichlin, 1977
Carmenta wellerae  Duckworth & Eichlin, 1976
Carmenta whitelyi (Druce, 1899)
Carmenta wielgusi Eichlin, 1987
Carmenta xanthomelanina (Zukowsky, 1936)
Carmenta xanthoneura (Zukowsky, 1936b)

References

Sesiidae